Phyllonorycter fletcheri is a moth   of the family Gracillariidae. It is found in Uganda (the Ruwenzori Range) in mountainous forests at altitude above 1,000 meters.

The length of the forewings is 2.6 mm. The forewing is elongate and the ground colour is golden ochreous white markings. The hindwings are pale fuscous and the fringe is pale fuscous with ochreous shading. Adults are on wing in early September.

Etymology
The species is named in honour of D. S. Fletcher, the author of The Generic Names of Moths of the World and the collector of the holotype.

References

Endemic fauna of Uganda
Moths described in 2012
fletcheri
Insects of Uganda
Moths of Africa

Taxa named by Jurate de Prins